Jesus "Bombo" Rivera Torres (born August 2, 1952) is a former Major League Baseball outfielder. At the age of seven, his youth baseball manager started calling him "Bombo", meaning "fly ball," and the nickname stuck. Aside from baseball, Rivera also excelled in track and field. He ran the 100 meters and threw shot put at Ponce High School. He followed in the footsteps of his grandfather, who was known for his "bomba and plena" musical skills, and played percussion for Ponce’s local bomba plena bands.

Playing career

Minor leagues
Rivera signed with the Montreal Expos in 1970 and during his first season in the Expos farm system, while playing for the Gulf Coast League Expos in Bradenton, Florida, Rivera and some of his teammates took a trip to see the major league club play. The game was against the Pittsburgh Pirates, and Rivera finally got to see his idol Roberto Clemente play in right field.

Puerto Rican winter ball
From 1977 to 1986, Rivera played his Puerto Rican winter ball with the Mayaguez Indians. During the 1977–78 season, Mayaguez won the Puerto Rican league championship and Caribbean Series in Mazatlán, Mexico, with a record of 5–1. Rivera was an important part of the team that he calls the best he ever played with in Puerto Rico. Other players on that championship team included major leaguers Jim Dwyer, Ron LeFlore, José Morales, Iván DeJesús, Ed Romero, Rick Sweet, Willie Hernández, Danny Darwin, and Kurt Bevacqua. Rivera was named to the series All Star team.

Major league career

Expos career
In 68 games that season, Rivera batted .276. He spent the entire  season back in the minors, and in October his contract was sold to the Minnesota Twins.

Back to the majors: Twins and Royals
He hit .281/.324/.392, and was the starting left fielder for the season.

He was released the following spring.

On to Japan
He was released by the team in 1986 due to a hamstring injury.

Later career and retirement
Rivera added another Puerto Rican League championship in the 1985–86 season. Also on that team were Bobby Bonilla, Wally Joyner, Tim Belcher, Paul O'Neill, Harold Reynolds, and Randy Ready. It was Rivera’s last season in Mayagüez. He finished his Puerto Rican baseball career with the Arecibo Wolves in 1989.

Today he lives in Mayagüez, Puerto Rico and works for a non-profit organization that offers sports clinics to disadvantaged children free of charge. He also stays close to Puerto Rican youth baseball by umpiring local games.

Cultural references
Rivera was the subject of a song in the late 1970s by Garrison Keillor named "The Ballad of Bombo Rivera." There is also a brief mention of Bombo Rivera in W. P. Kinsella's Shoeless Joe, the basis for the film Field of Dreams. Rivera also received hundreds of write-in votes in the 1979 University of Minnesota election for student council president, coming in second place.

See also
 List of Major League Baseball players from Puerto Rico

References

External links

1952 births
Living people
Caribbean Series managers
Denver Bears players
Ganaderos de Tabasco players
Gulf Coast Expos players
Jamestown Falcons players
Kansas City Royals players
Kintetsu Buffaloes players
Louisville Redbirds players
Major League Baseball left fielders
Major League Baseball players from Puerto Rico
Major League Baseball right fielders
Memphis Blues players
Minnesota Twins players
Montreal Expos players
Nippon Professional Baseball outfielders
Omaha Royals players
Puerto Rican expatriate baseball players in Canada
Puerto Rican expatriate baseball players in Japan
Puerto Rican expatriate baseball players in Mexico
Québec Carnavals players
Rieleros de Aguascalientes players
Saraperos de Saltillo players
Sportspeople from Ponce, Puerto Rico
Sultanes de Monterrey players
West Palm Beach Expos players